The Cares is a river in Northern Spain that flows through the autonomous communities of Asturias and León until it joins the Deva River and flows into the Atlantic Ocean at the Bay of Biscay. It forms the Tina Mayor estuary, the natural border between Asturias and Cantabria.

The Cares is known because of the narrow and spectacular canyon it forms when passing the Picos de Europa. A trekking path, "Ruta del Cares", runs along the river. The stream is also known for the quality of its salmon.

The Cares river is joined by de Deva river. Many companies rent kayaks to descend both rivers. Kayaking is popular here during the summer.

See also 
 List of rivers of Spain

External links
 The Cares Route, Official Page in English
 Cares Canyon route and pictures, in English
 Cares Canyon tourist information and pictures
 Cares Canyon pictures
 The route, in English

Rivers of Spain
Rivers of Asturias
Rivers of Castile and León
Picos de Europa